Erik Simon Norrthon (born 4 August 1967) is a Swedish actor born in Fosie, Malmö. He studied at the Swedish National Academy of Mime and Acting from 1989 to 1992. At the 29th Guldbagge Awards, he was nominated for the Best Actor award for his role in Speak Up! It's So Dark.

In 2018, he became the chairman of The Swedish Union for Performing Arts and Film.

Selected filmography
1993 - Allis med is (TV)
1993 - Speak Up! It's So Dark
1994 - Rapport till himlen (TV)
2000 - The New Country (TV)
2003 - Kvarteret Skatan (TV)
2003 - Kommer du med mig då
2005 - Medicinmannen (TV)
2006 - Wallander – Blodsband
2006 - LasseMajas detektivbyrå (TV, Julkalendern)
2010 - Hotell Gyllene Knorren (TV, Julkalendern)

References

External links

Swedish Film Database

Living people
Swedish male actors
1967 births
Actors from Malmö
20th-century Swedish people
21st-century Swedish people